(Latin for "the more difficult reading is the stronger") is a main principle of textual criticism. Where different manuscripts conflict on a particular reading, the principle suggests that the more unusual one is more likely the original. The presupposition is that scribes would more often replace odd words and hard sayings with more familiar and less controversial ones, than vice versa. Lectio difficilior potior is an internal criterion, which is independent of criteria for evaluating the manuscript in which it is found, and that it is as applicable to manuscripts of a roman courtois or a classical poet as it is to a biblical text.

The principle was one among a number that became established in early 18th-century text criticism, as part of attempts by scholars of the Enlightenment to provide a neutral basis for discovering an urtext that was independent of the weight of traditional authority.

History
According to Paolo Trovato, who cites as source Sebastiano Timpanaro, the principle was first mentioned by Jean Leclerc in 1696 in his Ars critica.
It was widely promulgated by Johann Jakob Wettstein, to whom it is often attributed.

Usefulness
Many scholars considered the employment of  an objective criterion that would even override other evaluative considerations. The poet and scholar A. E. Housman challenged such reactive applications in 1922, in the provocatively titled article "The Application of Thought to Textual Criticism".

On the other hand, taken as an axiom, the principle  produces an eclectic text, rather than one based on a history of manuscript transmission. "Modern eclectic praxis operates on a variant unit basis without any apparent consideration of the consequences", Maurice A. Robinson warned. He suggested that to the principle "should be added a corollary, difficult readings created by individual scribes do not tend to perpetuate in any significant degree within transmissional history".

A noted proponent of the superiority of the Byzantine text-type, the form of the Greek New Testament in the largest number of surviving manuscripts, Robinson would use the corollary to explain differences from the Majority Text as scribal errors that were not perpetuated because they were known to be errant or because they existed only in a small number of manuscripts at the time.

Most textual-critical scholars would explain the corollary by the assumption that scribes tended to "correct" harder readings and so cut off the stream of transmission. Thus, only earlier manuscripts would have the harder readings. Later manuscripts would not see the corollary principle as being a very important one to get closer to the original form of the text.

However,  is not to be taken as an absolute rule either but as a general guideline. "In general the more difficult reading is to be preferred" is Bruce Metzger's reservation. "There is truth in the maxim:  ('the more difficult reading is the more probable reading')", write Kurt and Barbara Aland.

However, for scholars like Kurt Aland, who follow a path of reasoned eclecticism based on evidence both internal and external to the manuscripts, "this principle must not be taken too mechanically, with the most difficult reading adopted as original simply because of its degree of difficulty". Also, Martin Litchfield West cautions: "When we choose the 'more difficult reading'... we must be sure that it is in itself a plausible reading. The principle should not be used in support of dubious syntax, or phrasing that it would not have been natural for the author to use. There is an important difference between a more difficult reading and a more unlikely reading".

See also 

 Bayes' theorem
 Lectio brevior
 Criterion of embarrassment

References

Further reading 
 Maurice A. Robinson, 2001. "New Testament Textual Criticism: The Case for Byzantine Priority"
 D. A. Carson, 1991. "Silent in the Churches" in Recovering Biblical Manhood and Womanhood: A Response to Evangelical Feminism, Wayne Grudem and John Piper, eds. (Council on Biblical Manhood and Womanhood).
 Kurt Aland and Barbara Aland, rev, ed. 1995. The Text of the New Testament an Introduction to the Critical Editions and to the Theory and Practice of Modern Textual Criticism
 Martin L. West, 1973. Textual Criticism and Editorial Technique applicable to Greek and Latin texts (Stuttgart: B.G. Teubner)

Biblical criticism
Latin literary phrases
Textual criticism
Textual scholarship